Lynn Greenland is an international lawn bowler representing Spain.

Bowls career
Greenland joined the Spanish squad in 2007. She represented Spain in the singles event and pairs event at the 2012 World Outdoor Bowls Championship. In 2013, she won three medals including a gold medal at the European Bowls Championships in Spain.

References 

Living people
Bowls European Champions
Year of birth missing (living people)